Mondher Kebaier (born 2 April 1970) is a Tunisian former football player and the current coach of Raja Club Athletic.

Career
Formerly a player at hometown club CA Bizertin, Kebaier became manager of the club in 2000, following a spell at AS Djerba that began in 1998. Kebaier thus moved to AS Kasserine, before joining Étoile du Sahel for two spells, beginning in 2010. In 2013, Kebaier rejoined Bizertin, winning the 2013 Tunisian Cup. 

In 2014, Kebaier joined Club Africain, before moving to AS Marsa in the same year, departing in 2016. In 2016, Kebaier joined Espérance de Tunis as a youth coach, managing the club for a month at the start of 2018. 

In August 2019, Kebaier was appointed manager of Tunisia on a three-year contract, replacing the outgoing Alain Giresse.

On September 24 2022, he was appointed as new coach of Raja Club Athletic after the early departure of his compatriot Faouzi Benzarti.

Honours

Managerial
CA Bizertin
 Tunisian Cup: 2013

References

1970 births
Living people
People from Bizerte
Tunisian footballers
Association football defenders
CA Bizertin players
Tunisian football managers
AS Djerba managers
Club Athlétique Bizertin managers
AS Kasserine managers
Étoile Sportive du Sahel managers
Club Africain football managers
AS Marsa managers
Espérance Sportive de Tunis managers
Tunisia national football team managers
Raja CA managers